The large moth family Crambidae contains the following genera beginning with "V":

References 

 V
Crambid